There have been three ships named USS Mistletoe:

 —a tug boat that served during the American Civil War
 —a wooden tender that served as a patrol boat during World War I
 —a buoy tender built in 1939 that served with the U.S. Coast Guard and later with the U.S. Navy during World War II.

United States Navy ship names